Adam Fergusson may refer to:
Adam Fergusson (Upper Canada politician) (1783–1862), early Canadian politician
Sir Adam Fergusson, 3rd Baronet (1733–1813), British Member of Parliament for Ayrshire and Edinburgh
Adam Fergusson (MEP) (born 1932), Member of European Parliament for Strathclyde East, 1979–1984
Adam Johnston Fergusson Blair (1815–1867), known prior to 1862 as Adam Johnston Fergusson, Canadian colonial-era politician

See also
Adam Ferguson (disambiguation)